National Smart Cities Mission is an urban renewal and retrofitting program by the Government of India with the mission to develop smart cities across the country, making them citizen friendly and sustainable. The Union Ministry of Urban Development is responsible for implementing the mission in collaboration with the state governments of the respective cities. The mission initially included 100 cities, with the deadline for completion of the projects set between 2019 and 2023. The effective combined completion of all projects as of 2019 is at 11%. , 3577 projects out of total 6939 tendered projects have been completed, utilizing ₹60,073 crore out of total tendered amount of ₹191,294 crore.

Description
Smart Cities Mission envisions developing an area within the cities in the country as model areas based on an area development plan, which is expected to have a rub-off effect on other parts of the city, and nearby cities and towns. Cities will be selected based on the Smart Cities challenge, where cities will compete in a countrywide competition to obtain the benefits from this mission. As of January 2018, 99 cities have been selected to be upgraded as part of the Smart Cities Mission after they defeated other cities in the challenge.

It is a five-year program in which, except for West Bengal, all of the Indian states and Union territories are participating by nominating at least one city for the Smart Cities challenge. Financial aid will be given by the central and state governments between 2017–2022 to the cities, and the mission will start showing results from 2022 onwards. An industry association has also been formed in name of National Association of Smartcity Developers & Aggregators (NASDA) for doing policy advocacy and building ecosystem to support stakeholders. 

Each city will create a Special Purpose Vehicle (SPV), headed by a full-time CEO, to implement the Smart Cities Mission. Centre and state government will provide  funding to the company, as equal contribution of  each. The company has to raise additional funds from the financial markets.

History

"100 Smart Cities Mission" was launched by Prime Minister Narendra Modi on 25 June 2015.

In the 2014 Union budget of India, Finance Minister Arun Jaitley allocated  for the 150 smart cities. However, only  of the allocated amount could be spent until February 2015. Hence, the 2015 Union budget of India allocated only  for the project.

The first batch of 20 cities was selected. The Urban Development Ministry had earlier released  each to mission cities for preparation of Smart City Plans.

Smart City Challenge
The Ministry of Urban Development (MoUD) program used a competition-based method as a means for selecting cities for funding, based on an area-based development strategy. Cities competed at the state level with other cities within the state. Then the state-level winner competed at the national level Smart City Challenge. Cities obtaining the highest marks in a particular round were chosen to be part of the mission.

The state governments were asked to nominate potential cities based on state-level competition, with overall cities across India limited to 100. In August 2015 the Ministry of Urban Development released the list of 98 nominees sent in by state governments.

All the participating cities from West Bengal (New Town, Kolkata, Bidhannagar, Durgapur, Haldia) have withdrawn from the Smart Cities Mission. Mumbai and Navi Mumbai from Maharashtra have also been withdrawn from the Smart Cities Mission.

List of cities nominated by states for the smart city challenge
There are 98 nominated by states national level smart cities challenge, based on state level competition. 100 cities were supposed to be nominated but Jammu and Kashmir and Uttar Pradesh did not use one slot each.

 Jammu & Kashmir was allocated one city but it could not submit the proposal on-time for the first round of the challenge.
 All cities from West Bengal have withdrawn from the Smart Cities Mission.
 Mumbai and Navi Mumbai have withdrawn from the Smart Cities Mission.
 Uttar Pradesh and Tamil Nadu will have the most smart cities under Smart Cities Mission

1st Round winners – Selection of 20 Smart Cities
Minister of Urban Development) Shri Venkaiah Naidu announced the selected top 20 from among the 98 nominated cities on 28 January 2016. Bhubaneswar topped the list of the top 20, followed by Pune and Jaipur.

2nd Round winners – Selection of 13 Smart Cities

* New Town Kolkata has withdrawn from the Smart Cities Mission after the Bengal government decided to withdraw all cities from the competition. It has rejected 1,000 crore to be given for development of the city as smart city.

3rd round winners – Selection of 27 Smart Cities
In this round state capital cities Patna, Thiruvananthapuram, Bengaluru, Itanagar, Gangtok, Shimla, Naya Raipur were allowed to compete in the Smart Cities challenge above and beyond the quota allocated to the state. It has also allowed the governments of Jammu and Kashmir and Uttar Pradesh to nominate two cities each — Jammu and Srinagar, and Rae Bareli and Meerut respectively — in contravention of the rules. Overall 110 cities will compete for the 100 slots.

The following is the third smart city list:

4th round winners – Selection of 30 Smart Cities
The following are the cities included in the Smart Cities Mission in 4th round:

PCMC, Pune replaced Navi Mumbai as a nomination from Maharashtra for the Smart Cities Mission.

5th round winners – Selection of 10 Smart Cities

There is now a total of 100 cities which have been added to the Smart Cities Mission.
The following are the cities included in the 5th round:

References

External links
 Official Website
 News on Smart City Mission
 Smart Cities Challenges 
 Ministry of Urban Development 
 What is Smart City - according to the Smart city mission
 Smart Cities: Mission Statement & Guidelines

Ministry of Urban Development
Modi administration initiatives
 
Urban planning in India
Indian missions